Joaquín Navarro Perona (2 August 1921 – 6 November 2002) was a Spanish professional footballer who played as a defender.

Club career
Born in Gavà, Barcelona, Catalonia, Navarro moved to local and La Liga giants FC Barcelona in 1941, from hometown club CF Gavà. In his only season at the Camp Nou he won the Copa del Generalísimo, but appeared sparingly in the league albeit scoring three goals.

Subsequently, Navarro joined neighbouring CE Sabadell FC in Segunda División, promoting in his first year. In the following six seasons he suffered two top flight relegations with the club, and netted a career-best five goals in 21 games in the 1947–48 campaign as the Arlequinats finished in 12th position, narrowly avoiding another drop.

In the summer of 1949, Navarro signed for Real Madrid, playing 21 matches (one goal) in his first season. During his eight-year spell with the Merengues he took part in 272 official games and won five major titles, including three leagues and the 1955–56 edition of the European Cup, contributing with three appearances in the latter competition.

Navarro retired in 1957 at the age of 36, playing 288 top level matches over 14 seasons. He died on 6 November 2002 in Barbastro, Aragon, aged 81.

International career
Navarro played five times for Spain, during slightly less than one year. He made his debut on 7 December 1952 in a 0–1 friendly loss to Argentina, in Madrid.

Additionally, Navarro was the first Spanish player to be selected to a World XI FIFA team, appearing in a 4–4 draw against England at Wembley on 21 October 1953 and being subsequently nicknamed El Fifo.

Personal life
Navarro's younger brother, Alfonso (born 8 April 1929), was also a footballer. A forward, he too played for Barcelona (1946–50, 1954–56) and Real Madrid (1950–51), also representing Real Valladolid, CA Osasuna and CD Condal in an 11-year professional career.

Navarro II died 10 August 1969 at age 40 after a long illness.

Honours
Barcelona
Copa del Generalísimo: 1942

Sabadell
Segunda División: 1945–46

Real Madrid
La Liga: 1953–54, 1954–55, 1956–57
European Cup: 1955–56
Latin Cup: 1955

References

External links

 
Madridista stats 

1921 births
2002 deaths
People from Gavà
Sportspeople from the Province of Barcelona
Spanish footballers
Footballers from Catalonia
Association football defenders
La Liga players
Segunda División players
CF Gavà players
FC Barcelona players
CE Sabadell FC footballers
Real Madrid CF players
Spain international footballers
Catalonia international footballers